was a Japanese mathematician who worked in algebraic number theory.

Biography
Tannaka was born in Matsuyama, Ehime Prefecture on December 27, 1908. After receiving a Bachelor of Science in mathematics from Tohoku Imperial University in 1932, he was appointed a lecturer in the university in 1934 and received a Doctor of Science degree from the university in 1941. He was promoted to assistant professor in 1942 and full professor in 1945. Tannaka was a member at the Institute for Advanced Study from September 1955 to April 1957. Tannaka retired from Tohoku University in 1972, after which he served as a full professor at Tohoku Gakuin University until 1981.

Tannaka was an editor of the Tohoku Mathematical Journal and a member of the board of directors of the Mathematical Society of Japan. Tannaka was also in charge of the "Mathematics Chat" article series in the monthly  magazine from 1960 onwards.

Tannaka died in Tokyo on October 25, 1986.

Research
Tannaka is known for developing the theory of Tannaka–Krein duality, which generalizes Pontryagin duality to noncommutative compact groups and led to the development of Tannakian formalism.

Awards
Tannaka was a recipient of the Order of the Rising Sun (3rd Class) in 1980.

See also
 Tannaka–Artin problem

References 

20th-century Japanese mathematicians
1908 births
1986 deaths
Academic staff of Tohoku University
Tohoku University alumni
Institute for Advanced Study visiting scholars
Academic staff of Tohoku Gakuin University
People from Matsuyama, Ehime